Sepak takraw at the 27th Southeast Asian Games took place at Wunna Theikdi Indoor Stadium in Naypyidaw, Myanmar between December 11–22.

Medal summary

Men

Women

Medal table

Results

Men

Team

Preliminary round

Regu

Preliminary round

Group A

Group B

Double Team

Double Regu

Hoop Takraw

Preliminary round

Report

Final

Report

Women

Team

Regu

Double Team

Double Regu

Hoop Takraw

Preliminary round

Report

Final

Report

References

2013 Southeast Asian Games events
2013